Give Me Rest is the third studio album from Hands. Facedown Records released the album on July 5, 2011. Hands worked with Joshua Barber and Shane Ochsner, in the production of this album.

Critical reception

Awarding the album four stars from HM Magazine, Rob Shameless states, "The is one of the most dynamic records Hands has ever put out." Aziz, rating the album 3.5 out of five for Sputnikmusic, writes, "A wholly lustrous album, rife with moving and expressive vocal performances at every turn and relaxing yet inexorable [guitar work] across the board, Hands’ latest offering has few faults." Giving the album four and a half stars at Jesus Freak Hideout, Wayne Reimer says, "It's thick with relatable emotion, carried on the back of extremely robust musicianship." Rating the album an 8.0 out of ten by Mind Equals Blown, Sebastian Fonseca states, "Give Me Rest is really a gem of an album, it’s original while still being accessible, and it’s pummeling while still being soothing." Jeremiah Holdsworth, awarding the album five stars from Indie Vision Music, writes, "This album is captivating, musically and lyrically, from beginning to end."

Track listing

References

2011 albums
Facedown Records albums